The Golden Show is an Australian television series which aired in 1964 on the Australian Television Network, which later became the Seven Network.

Hosted by Billy Raymond, the daytime series featuring interviews, a talent segment, and an audience sing-along. The series was produced in Sydney.

References

External links
The Golden Show on IMDb

1964 Australian television series debuts
1964 Australian television series endings
Black-and-white Australian television shows
English-language television shows
Seven Network original programming